Game On! is the eighth studio album by Tina Guo and it is themed around video game music. It was recorded in Los Angeles and released on 10 February 2017. It also featured the Budapest Symphony Orchestra and the vocals from Kvitrafn.

Track listing
 "The Legends of Zelda" – 5:58 
 "Final Fantasy VII" – 6:34 
 "Chrono Trigger" – 2:51 
 "World of Warcraft" – 5:03 
 "Skyrim" – 3:42 
 "Uncharted - Nate's Theme" – 3:11
 "Super Mario Bros" – 3:33
 "Pokémon" – 3:04
 "Journey" – 5:09
 "The Witcher 3: Wild Hunt" – 2:48 
 "Halo" – 4:13
 "Metal Gear Solid" – 4:25
 "Call of Duty:Modern Walfare 2" – 3:51 
 "Tetris" - 4:14

Release history

References

External links
Game On! by Tina Guo
Tina Guo – Game On!
Tina Guo Game On!

2017 albums
Tina Guo albums
Albums about video games
Sony Music albums